Milo Cipra (born as Emil Cipra, 13 October 1906 – 9 July 1985) was a Croatian composer, member of the Croatian Academy of Sciences and Arts (since 1976), dean of the Zagreb Music Academy (1961–1971).

Major works
Sonatina u d-molu for piano, 1930
Slavenska rapsodija for orchestra, 1931
Sonata za violinu i klavir, 1944
I. simfonija, 1948
II. simfonija, 1952
Kantata o čovjeku, 1958
Sunčev put, 1959
Musica sine nomine, 1963
Aubade, 1965
Leda, 1965
Triptihon dalmatinskih gradova, 1969–1976
Meditation sur Re, 1975
Trio za obou, klarinet i fagot, 1978

References

External links
 
 The New Grove Dictionary of Music and Musicians
 Signs... Fragments... Some Observations on the Music of Milo Cipra (1906-1985), by Dalibor Davidović, International Review of the Aesthetics and Sociology of Music (2001) 1, 93-132

1906 births
1985 deaths
Croatian composers
Burials at Mirogoj Cemetery
Vladimir Nazor Award winners
20th-century composers